Jean P. Brodie is a British astrophysicist. She is professor of astronomy and astrophysics at the University of California, Santa Cruz and an astronomer at the Lick Observatory.

Education 
Brodie has a B.Sc. from the University of London and a Ph.D. from Emmanuel College, Cambridge and the Institute of Astronomy, Cambridge.

Career 
After her doctorate at Cambridge, Brodie became a post-doctoral fellow at University of California, Berkeley (1980–82), then a research fellow at Girton College, Cambridge and the Institute of Astronomy, Cambridge (1982–84), and returned to UCB as an assistant research astronomer (1984–87). She took up a post of assistant professor/astronomer at the University of California, Santa Cruz in 1987, and became associate professor/astronomer there in 1991 and professor/astronomer in 1997.

Her main research interests are globular star clusters and galaxy formation.

She founded the international research network Study of the Astrophysics of Globular Clusters in Extragalactic Systems (SAGES), from which developed the SAGES Legacy Unifying Globulars and GalaxieS Survey. Its short name, the SLUGGS Survey, honours the banana slug which is the mascot of UCSC.

She is a collaborator on the Hubble Heritage Project and a member of the International Astronomical Union.

Honors and awards 
In 1990, Brodie was awarded a Guggenheim Fellowship in astronomy and astrophysics.

References

Year of birth missing (living people)
Living people
University of California, Santa Cruz faculty
Alumni of Emmanuel College, Cambridge
Alumni of the University of London
British astrophysicists
Women astrophysicists
20th-century British physicists
20th-century British women scientists
21st-century British physicists
21st-century British women scientists